Harry F. Gerguson (born Hershel Geguzin, February 20, 1890 – September 1, 1971), known as Michael Romanoff, was a Hollywood restaurateur, con man and actor born in Lithuania. He is perhaps best remembered as the owner of the now-defunct Romanoff's, a Beverly Hills restaurant popular with Hollywood stars in the 1940s and 1950s.

He claimed to be a member of Russia's royal House of Romanov (sometimes spelled "Romanoff" in English). This was widely known to be untrue throughout his career, but press reports tended to treat the deception as a humorous matter.

Background
The New Yorker ran a series of five profiles, starting October 29, 1932, tracing Romanoff's history from birth until date of publication, including his having been deported to France in May of that year to serve time for fraud.

According to U.S.A Confidential (Mortimer and Lait, 1952), though Romanoff pretended to be Russian royalty, he was actually a former Brooklyn pants presser.

Geguzin emigrated to New York City at age 10. He changed his name from Hershel to Harry F. Gerguson some time after 1900 and married Gloria Lister in 1948.

At times, he passed himself off as "Count Gladstone the son of William Gladstone, "Prince Michael Dimitri Alexandrovich Obolensky-Romanoff", nephew of Tsar Nicholas II, William Wellington or Arthur Wellesley.

David Niven devotes a whole chapter in his memoirs to Romanoff/Gerguson. Romanoff tells Niven to remember him to Commando chief Bob Laycock whom he knew at Eton. Niven dismisses this as nonsense, then Gerguson shows Niven a set of hair brushes with the Laycock crest and Niven is chastened. Niven learns that Gerguson took part in a cricket match at Wiseton, Notts (home of the Laycock family) involving a coal mining team. 'What were you doing down a Durham coal mine?' asks Niven. There is also a record of a Harry Gerguson escaping from hospital in 1923 in US immigration files.

Romanoff died of a heart attack in Los Angeles, California, in 1971 aged 81.

Romanoff's restaurant
From 1941 to 1962, Romanoff's was located at 326 North Rodeo Drive, and had another location at 140 South Rodeo Drive in Beverly Hills. In 1951, it moved to a new location at 240 South Rodeo Drive.

Romanoff generally snubbed his clientele, and preferred to lunch with his dogs.

KCET's Hadley Meares writes of the restaurant, which used an elegant monogram consisting of a crown sitting over two capital letter 'R's back to back: "The décor was masculine and clubby with comfortable booths, the dance floor well waxed, the cigarette girls lovely, and the waiters well-trained and Jeeves-like."

While Romanoff's featured a typical country club-style menu with items like Waldorf salad, tomatoes stuffed with crab, filet mignon, frog legs, eggs Benedict and sausages on toast, the restaurant became known for its chocolate soufflés, which were served to each guest in an individual portion. Although Romanoff's restaurant is also known for popularizing the "American version" of the famous dessert Strawberries Romanoff, it was actually created by Escoffier when he was the chef at the Carlton Hotel in London – where he had originally called it "Strawberries Americaine Style" - strawberries in Grand Marnier, blended into whipped cream and softened ice cream.

Noodles Romanoff, a dish of wide egg noodles, sour cream, and grated Parmesan cheese that originally appeared at Romanoff's in the mid-1950s, became a popular item often mentioned in Hollywood reporting. Later, after Romanoff's went out of business, the dish was served at Stouffer's Top of the Rock Restaurant in Chicago. When Stouffer's closed that restaurant, the company transferred Noodles Romanoff to its newly formed frozen food grocery division. Soon, various companies' versions of Noodles Romanoff could be purchased in grocery stores for preparation at home. It was a popular side dish on American dinner tables through the 1960s, and recipes for it are available from Betty Crocker, Creamette, and others.

The restaurant closed its doors for good on New Year's Eve in 1962.

Romanoff's On The Rocks 
In 1959, Romanoff's On The Rocks opened in Palm Springs. Paul Whiteman and Red Norvo headed the house band. On The Rocks closed in 1962, and the venue became the Pompeii nightclub, later destroyed by arson.

In popular culture
Romanoff is referenced in 1941's Hellzapoppin', the film version of the famous Broadway musical revue. In the film, Mischa Auer plays a "real Russian prince who is pretending to be a fake Russian prince." Although he is penniless, his deception gets him invited to high-society parties, where he can sponge off the guests and gorge himself on the food. He tells a fellow Russian expatriate, "Better that everyone should think I am a fake Russian prince. If they knew I was a real Russian prince, the novelty would wear off, and nobody would want me!"

At an early point in the original 1947 version of Miracle on 34th Street, a doctor expresses the opinion that Kris Kringle is of no harm to anyone despite his insistence that he is Santa Claus. In a reference to Romanoff, the doctor compares Kringle to a well-known restaurant owner – whose name escapes him at the moment – who insists that he is a member of the Russian royal family, but is otherwise quite normal.

Romanoff was one of several guest stars on The Jack Benny Program radio show on 8 January 1950. The episode featured Benny and other regular cast members attempting to solve a murder that had taken place at the Romanoff's in Beverly Hills.  The episode is perhaps better known for having one of the longest laughs in the history of the series, based on a spoonerism of the name "Drew Pearson", pronounced "Drear Pooson", and quick thinking by the writers to incorporate the flub later in the program without telling Benny.

Romanoff was the guest star on the December 8, 1950 "Selling the Tavern" episode of the Duffy's Tavern radio show.  In typical Tavern style, his claims of royalty are roundly mocked and even his small stature is joked about.
Romanoff can also be heard as a contestant on the 28 November 1951 radio edition of the Groucho Marx quiz, You Bet Your Life.  The television broadcast took place the next day.

In April 1957, the Jayne Mansfield–Sophia Loren photo, was taken at Romanoff's restaurant.

In April 1957, he was a mystery guest on the television panel show What's My Line?.

In the 1960 film Strangers When We Meet Kirk Douglas and Barbara Rush are seen dining at Romanoff's restaurant. Mike Romanoff himself make an uncredited appearance.

The exterior of the then-shuttered Romanoff's can be seen in the 1967 Fox film, A Guide for the Married Man. Romanoff himself also plays the maitre'd in a sequence in the film in a studio recreation of the restaurant's interior.

The 1965 cartoon series Roger Ramjet features a recurring villain named Noodles Romanoff.

In addition to appearing in the above-mentioned A Guide for the Married Man as himself, Romanoff appeared in at least 20 other films and television shows playing either himself or acting in bit roles, such as a prince, maitre d', nobleman, or some other type of sophisticated European gentleman.

In 1977, Boz Scaggs' Down Two Then Left's album cover photography by Guy Bourdin features the then-shuttered Romanoff's restaurant

In his last credited role, Alfred Ryder played Romanoff in the 1980 Humphrey Bogart TV-biopic Bogie.

Filmography

References

Further reading

External links
 
 

1890 births
1971 deaths
20th-century American male actors
People from Palm Springs, California
American restaurateurs
Emigrants from the Russian Empire to the United States
Romanov impostors